Love Calls is an album by saxophonist Eddie "Lockjaw" Davis with Paul Gonsalves recorded in 1968 for the RCA Victor label.

Reception

Allmusic awarded the album three stars and  Ron Wynn states, "Paul Gonsalves (ts) matches fours and spirit with Davis".

Track listing 
 "Love Is Here to Stay" (George Gershwin, Ira Gershwin) -    
 "When Sunny Gets Blue" (Jack Segal, Marvin Fisher) -     
 "If I Ruled The World" (Leslie Bricusse, Cyril Ornadel) -     
 "Time After Time" (Sammy Cahn, Jule Styne) -    
 "Just Friends" (John Klenner, Sam M. Lewis) -     
 "Don't Blame Me" (Dorothy Fields, Jimmy McHugh) -     
 "I Should Care" (Axel Stordahl, Paul Weston, Sammy Cahn) -    
 "The Man With the Horn" (Eddie DeLange, Jack Jenney, Bonnie Lake) -     
 "We'll Be Together Again" (Carl T. Fischer, Frankie Laine) -     
 "A Weaver Of Dreams" (Victor Young, Jack Elliott) -     
 "If I Should Lose You" (Ralph Rainger, Leo Robin) -

Personnel 
 Eddie "Lockjaw" Davis, Paul Gonsalves - tenor saxophone  
 Roland Hanna - piano
 Ben Tucker - bass
 Grady Tate - drums

References 

Eddie "Lockjaw" Davis albums
1968 albums
RCA Victor albums